Project Runway: Junior is an American reality television series that premiered on November 12, 2015 on Lifetime. It is the eighth direct spin-off series of another series, Project Runway, which airs on the same network. It featured twelve teen designers aged between 13 and 17. The designers were described by Tim Gunn as "kids [who] have grown up watching this show" (Project Runway).

The show was co-hosted by Tim Gunn and Hannah Jeter, with Gunn also serving as the designers' workroom mentor. In his role as mentor, Tim Gunn had a "Tim Gunn Save" with which he could bring back an eliminated designer once during the season at his discretion. The three judges were fashion designer Christian Siriano (Project Runway Season 4's winner), fashion critic and designer Kelly Osbourne and Aya Kanai, Executive Fashion Director at Cosmopolitan and Seventeen magazines. Of note, unlike other versions of Project Runway, the only episode with a guest judge was the finale.

According to Executive Producer Sara Rea, Project Runway: Junior is a re-creation of the original adult series with no concessions in the difficulty of challenges or critiques being made for the contestants' ages. The unconventional challenge featured items from a car wash and one challenge was introduced by First Lady Michelle Obama. The winner of Project Runway: Junior received a full scholarship to the prestigious Fashion Institute of Design & Merchandising in California, a complete home sewing and crafting studio provided by Brother, a feature in Seventeen Magazine and a $25,000 cash prize to help launch their line plus a Visionworks shopping spree.

In May 2016, Lifetime renewed Project Runway: Junior for a second and third season in a deal with The Weinstein Company.

Contestants (Season 1)

Challenges

Results
 The designer won Project Runway: Junior Season 1.
 The designer advanced to Fashion Week.
 The designer won that challenge.
 The designer had the second highest score for that challenge.
 The designer had one of the highest scores for that challenge, but did not win.
 The designer had one of the lowest scores for that challenge, but was not eliminated.
 The designer was in the bottom two, but was not eliminated.
 The designer lost and was eliminated.
 The designer lost, but was brought back to the competition by Tim Gunn.

Episodes
Sources:

Episode 1:  Welcome to New York
Original airdate: November 12, 2015

The next generation of up-and-coming fashionistas, ages 13 to 17, will be mentored by Emmy® Award winner Tim Gunn who co-hosts alongside supermodel Hannah Davis.

 WINNER: Samantha
 ELIMINATED: Sami

Episode 2:  An Unconventional Carwash!
Original airdate: November 19, 2015

In Project Runway: Junior's first ever unconventional challenge, the young designers must create garments out of materials found at a carwash. Who will be inspired by the microfiber, tubing and sponges and who will be washed out of the competition?

 WINNER: Zachary
 ELIMINATED: Ysabel

Episode 3:  Teamwork is Hard
Original airdate: December 3, 2015

The designers are divided into two teams of five and must create cohesive mini collections inspired by the decades. When one team gets off to a bad start, they find themselves going back to the drawing board...more than once!!!

 WINNER: Bridget
 ELIMINATED: None

Episode 4:  OMG! That's Michelle Obama
Original airdate: December 10, 2015

First Lady Michelle Obama surprises the designers with one of the most exciting challenges of the season when one winning design will be manufactured and sold on Land's End to benefit the Peace Corps' initiative, Let Girls Learn.

 WINNER: Peytie
 ELIMINATED: Jesse & Victoria

Episode 5: Race to the Red Carpet
Original airdate: December 17, 2015

The designers are tasked with creating a red carpet look in only five short hours. Tim brings in some talented surprise guests to help them get the job done!

WINNERS: Maya & Peytie
ELIMINATED: Matt

Episode 6: Superstar Clients
Original airdate: January 7, 2016

The designers get up close and personal with the Knicks City Dancers, who are their clients for this challenge. For some of the designers, working with clients for the first time proves to be harder than they thought.

WINNER: Zach
ELIMINATED: Bridget

Episode 7: #OOTD
Original airdate: January 14, 2016

The designers hit the streets of New York to find their muses. They must use their muses "Outfits of the Day" as their inspiration. All of the judges struggle with one of the most emotional eliminations of the season.

WINNER: Maya & Samantha
ELIMINATED: Jaxson & Zach

Episode 8:  Make A Statement
Original airdate: January 21, 2016

In the final challenge, which determines who moves forward to compete during New York Fashion Week, the designers must create a look that makes a personal statement. The pressure gets to some of them as they realize how close they are to the finale.

 ADVANCE: Maya, Samantha and Peytie
 SAVE: Zachary

Episode 9: Finale, Part 1
Original airdate: January 28, 2016

The final designers head home to create collections for New York fashion week. Tim brings them back to New York for a check in halfway through, and the judges give them last minute advice before the big show.

ADVANCE: Maya, Samantha, Peytie, and Zachary
ELIMINATED: No One

Episode 10: Finale Part 2
Original airdate: February 4, 2016

The teen designers put the final touches on their collections and then show at New York Fashion week. The winner of the very first Project Runway: Junior is announced!

WINNER: Maya
RUNNER-UP: Samantha
3RD PLACE: Peytie
4TH PLACE: Zachary

References

External links
Project Runway: Junior Official Website
 
 Aya Kanai's website
 Let Girls Learn website

Project Runway (American series)
2010s American reality television series
2015 American television seasons
2015 American television series debuts
2015 in fashion
American television spin-offs
English-language television shows
Lifetime (TV network) original programming
Reality television spin-offs
Television series about teenagers
Television series by The Weinstein Company